Maria São Pedro Dias de Jesus (born 29 June 1995), known as Maria Dias, is a Brazilian footballer who plays as a forward for Real Brasília.

Club career
Maria Dias was born in Ipirá, Bahia, and made her senior debut with local side  in 2013. In 2017, she joined Rio Preto, and helped the side to win their second consecutive Campeonato Paulista de Futebol Feminino in that year.

On 18 January 2019, Maria Dias agreed to a contract with Santos.

Honours
Rio Preto
Campeonato Paulista de Futebol Feminino: 2017

Santos
Copa Paulista de Futebol Feminino: 2020

References

1995 births
Living people
Sportspeople from Bahia
Brazilian women's footballers
Women's association football forwards
Campeonato Brasileiro de Futebol Feminino Série A1 players
Santos FC (women) players